Yondota is an unincorporated community in Lucas County, in the U.S. state of Ohio.

History
A post office called Yondota was established in 1895, and remained in operation until 1906. The name Yondota may be derived from Wyandot.

References

Unincorporated communities in Lucas County, Ohio
Unincorporated communities in Ohio